Samuel Gordon (April 28, 1802 – October 28, 1873) was an American lawyer and politician who served as a United States representative from New York, serving two non-consecutive terms from 1841 to 1843, and from 1845 to 1847.

Biography
Gordon was born at Wattle's Ferry on April 28, 1802. He attended public schools and became a farmer. He later studied law, was admitted to the bar and commenced practice in Delhi.

Early political career 
Gordon was appointed postmaster of Delhi on September 14, 1831, and held that position until August 16, 1841. He was a member of the New York State Assembly, as district attorney of Delaware County and was town supervisor of the town of Delhi for several terms.

Congress 
In 1840, Gordon was elected as a Democrat to represent New York's 20th District in the 27th Congress (March 4, 1841 – March 3, 1843). In 1844, he was elected to represent New York's 10th District in the 29th Congress (March 4, 1845 – March 3, 1847).

Later career and death 
After leaving Congress, Gordon resumed the practice of law. During the American Civil War he was appointed provost marshal for the nineteenth district of New York.

He died in Delhi on October 28, 1873, with interment in Woodland Cemetery.

References

1802 births
1873 deaths
New York (state) lawyers
New York (state) postmasters
County district attorneys in New York (state)
Town supervisors in New York (state)
Democratic Party members of the New York State Assembly
People of New York (state) in the American Civil War
Democratic Party members of the United States House of Representatives from New York (state)
19th-century American politicians
19th-century American lawyers